Church of the Annunciation ( is a Roman Catholic church in the town of Bienno, in the Province of Brescia, Lombardy, northern Italy. 

The interior walls of the church contains numerous frescos from different periods that include a number of scenes of Madonna and Child, works by Giovanni Pietro da Cemmo and two scenes from the Life of Mary in the apse painted between 1537 and 1541 by Girolamo Romani.

See also
Giovanni Pietro da Cemmo
Girolamo Romani

External links

Maria Annunciata, Bienno